Like We Used to Be is an album by the progressive bluegrass Maryland band The Seldom Scene It's  a group reunion with their original singer/guitarist, John Starling. He recorded only this album and decided to continue concentrating on his career as ear, nose & throat physician.

Track listing
 Grandpa Get Your Guitar (McCullough, Jim Rushing) 02:54
 Let Me Be Your Friend (Carter Stanley) 02:45
 Like I Used to Do (Pat Alger, Tim O'Brien) 04:06
 Highway of Pain (Dauphin) 03:46
 Cheap Whiskey (Emory Gordy Jr., Jim Rushing) 03:46
 Philadelphia Lawyer (Woody Guthrie) 03:26
 Almost Threw Your Love Away (Germino, Hylton) 03:56
 The Other Side of Town (Clark, Williams, Williams) 02:59
 She's More to Be Pitied (Rakes) 03:01
 Heaven's Green Fields (Jim Rushing, Shamblin) 02:49
 I've Come to Take You Home (Coleman, Duffey) 03:09
 I'll Remember You Love in My Prayers (Hayes) 03:04
 Some Morning Soon (Lynch, Lynch) 03:36

Personnel
 John Starling - vocals, guitar
 John Duffey - mandolin, vocals
 Ben Eldridge - banjo, guitar, vocals
 Mike Auldridge - Dobro, guitar, vocals
 T. Michael Coleman - bass, vocals

with Pat McInerney - percussion, drums

References

External links
Official site

1994 albums
The Seldom Scene albums
Sugar Hill Records albums